Alice Arnold (1881–1955) was a socialist and trade unionist in Coventry.  She was one of the first women on the city council, serving for 36 years, and became the first female mayor of the city in 1937.

Arnold was born on 19 January 1881 in the Coventry Workhouse to Caroline and Samuel Arnold; her mother and three siblings had been admitted to the workhouse on 23 November 1880 and were discharged on 19 February 1882. Arnold was employed in factories from the age of eleven.  Her experiences made her want to improve life for people in her community and she became an organiser of the Worker's Union.

In 1919 she was elected as an independent Labour councillor in Coventry.  She campaigned for better living conditions for those living in the city.

In October 1938 she led a protest for 'peace and plenty' that culminated in a delegation of over 100 people delivering a petition signed by 60, 000 Coventry citizens (two-thirds of the city's electorate) to the Home Office. The aim of the petition was to promote peace and abolish poverty.

References

People from Coventry
1881 births
1955 deaths
Labour Party (UK) mayors
20th-century British women politicians
Trade unionists from Warwickshire
20th-century British politicians
Mayors of Coventry